Careri is a comune (municipality) in the Province of Reggio Calabria in the Italian region Calabria, located about  southwest of Catanzaro and about  east of Reggio Calabria.
Careri borders the following municipalities: Benestare, Platì, San Luca, Santa Cristina d'Aspromonte.

Demographic evolution

References

Cities and towns in Calabria